Hoseynabad-e Makhtari (also Romanized as Ḩoseynābād-e Makhtārī; also known as Ḩoseynābād) is a village in Rivand Rural District, in the Central District of Nishapur County, Razavi Khorasan Province, Iran. At the 2006 census, its population was 46, in 14 families.

References 

Populated places in Nishapur County